Sugar Creek Township is one of seventeen townships in Cedar County, Iowa, USA.  As of the 2000 census, its population was 375.

History
Sugar Creek Township is named for the Sugar Creek. The name of the creek may refer to either the large number of sugar maples growing along it or to the sweetness of the water.

Geography
According to the USGS, it contains six cemeteries: Centerville, Lime City, Sharon, South Bethel, Sugar Creek Church, and Whitmer.

References

External links
 US-Counties.com
 City-Data.com

Townships in Cedar County, Iowa
Townships in Iowa